Péter Lelkes (born 1 April 1990) is a Hungarian football player who currently plays for FC Fehérvár.

External links
 Profile

1990 births
Living people
Hungarian footballers
Fehérvár FC players
Association football forwards
Sportspeople from Székesfehérvár